The Marshes is an Australian supernatural horror film, written and directed by Roger Scott. The film stars Dafna Kronental, Sarah Armanious, Mathew Cooper, Sam Delich. The film was released in Australia in 2018 and in the US in 2020 via Shudder.

Plot
In a remote swampy area, three young biologists are conducting research to preserve the unique marshlands. But when they encounter something sinister intent on killing them, they have to forget about science and need to do everything just to survive.

Cast
Dafna Kronental as Pria
Sarah Armanious as Kylie
Mathew Cooper as Ben
Sam Delich as Will
Zac Drayson as Pig Hunter
Amanda McGregor as Female Hunter
Cass Cumerford as Petrol Attendant
Eddie Baroo as Swagman
Katie Beckett as Denise

References

External links
 
 

2018 films
2018 horror films
Australian  supernatural horror films
2020s English-language films
2020s Australian films